Sam Ketsekile (born 8 May 1981) is a Mosotho footballer who currently plays as a goalkeeper for Lesotho Prison Service. He has won 15 caps for the Lesotho national football team since 2007.

External links

Association football goalkeepers
Lesotho footballers
Lesotho international footballers
1981 births
Living people